Gandu in Iran may refer to:
 Gandu, Razavi Khorasan
 Gandu, Sistan and Baluchestan
 Kandu, Iran (disambiguation)